William Edward Shuckard (1803, Brighton – 10 November 1868, Kennington) was an English bookseller  and  entomologist.
He was also librarian of the Royal Society and translated Manual of Entomology Hermann Burmeister (1807-1892). He was a specialist in Hymenoptera but worked on
Coleoptera in his early years).

Publications

Partial list
 A Description of the Superior Wings of the Hymenoptera. Trans. Ent. Soc., London, Vol. I., p. 208, 1836. 
 Elements of British Entomology. London, 1839. 
 with Spry, W. The British Coleoptera Delineated 1840. 
 Monograph of the Dorylidae, a family of these Hymenoptera Heterogyna. Ann. Mag. Nat. Hist. (1)5: 258-271 (1840). 
 British Bees. An Introduction to the Study of the Natural History and Economy of the Bees Indigenous to the British Isles (1866)

Shuckard described many of the Hymenoptera collected by Charles Darwin on the Voyage of the Beagle.

He was a Fellow of the Entomological Society of London

References
Anthony Musgrave (1932). Bibliography of Australian Entomology, 1775–1930, with biographical notes on authors and collectors, Royal Zoological Society of News South Wales (Sydney) : viii + 380.

External links

 

English entomologists
Hymenopterists
1803 births
1868 deaths
Fellows of the Royal Entomological Society